Calamity, a Childhood of Martha Jane Cannary  (French: Calamity, une enfance de Martha Jane Cannary) is a 2020 French-Danish animated family feature film directed by Rémi Chayé. The film is loosely based on the life of the American frontierswoman Calamity Jane.

Plot 
Martha Jane Cannary, her father, and her sisters, are traveling with a caravan across the American West to Oregon. When her father is injured by their horse, she feels compelled to step up and take responsibility for their family's carriage. However, the leader of their group, Abraham, assigns his son Ethan to take over for Martha's father instead. Conflict ensues between Martha and Ethan as she fights to break free of the gender role assigned to her, while he struggles to earn his father's approval. Martha decides to secretly spends her nights training to lasso and ride a horse, and making pants for herself—something that was taboo since women were expected to wear dresses and skirts.

One day, their group encounters an American soldier, Samson, who informs them that they are heading the wrong direction. While Abraham is chagrined by this challenge to his authority, the group decides to trust the soldier and change course. Martha grows close to the soldier as he helps her take over control of her family's carriage from Ethan. After a particularly bad fight with Ethan in which he takes advantage of being able to pull her hair, she decides to cut it off. One night, the soldier mysteriously disappears along with a few valuable items from the group. The caravan suspects that Martha helped the soldier to steal their items so she decides to leave her family behind.

Having become an outcast to both her family and friends, Martha decides to run away to search for the soldier that robbed them. Along the way, she meets Jonas, a young man on his own looking for a way to make money. Though she at first tricks him into thinking that she was a boy and that her family would offer a reward for her safe return, they eventually become friends after escaping being captured by another group of travelers. Martha finds her way into a military camp where she suspects the soldier to be. She meets Madame Moustache and helps her find the gold in the mine she owns; in return, she helps Martha sneak into the military camp. When she finds Samson, she discovers that Ethan was the one that gave him the items, in order to bribe him to leave the group. Jonas decides to work Madame Moustache's gold mine, and Martha eventually is able to find and return to her caravan. Through proving to them that being female does not stop her from being capable of surviving in the Wild West, she is accepted back into the group.

Cast 

 Salomé Boulven as Martha Jane Cannary
 Alexandra Lamy as Madame Moustache
 Alexis Tomassian as Samson
 Jochen Hägele as Abraham
 Léonard Louf as Jonas
 Santiago Barban as Ethan
 Damien Witecka as Robert
 Bianca Tomassian as Eve
 Jérémy Bardeau as Carson
 Philippe Vincent as Paterson
 Jérôme Keen as Colonel
 Pascal Casanova as Sherif
 Violette Samama as Stella
 Lévanah Solomon as Esther
 Délia Régis as Lena
 Max Brunner as Elijah
 Gaspar Bellegarde as Joe
 Kylian Trouillard as Joshua
 Jean-Michel Vaubien as Louis

Music 

The original music for the film was composed by Florencia di Concilio. A soundtrack album, consisting of 23 songs from the film, was released digitally on 14 October 2020 by 22D Music.

Track Listing

Release 
Calamity had a limited release in France in June 2020. It then played in the feature film category for the Annecy International Animation Film Festival that was held virtually due to the COVID-19 pandemic, where it won the Cristal for a Feature Film.

The film made its US premiere at the FIAF Animation First Film Festival on February 5, 2021.

Critical response 
The film has been praised for its unique minimalist visual style that forgoes using outlines for characters and objects. Fabier Lemercier comments on how it "favours the simplicity of the line in an explosion of colours."

However, the ending of the film was critiqued by Vassilis Kroustallis who says it "tries to tie all loose ends in the final act, and seems to lose sight of the fact that the real Calamity had to re-create her own community from the start -instead of going back to her old ways."

Accolades

See also 

 Calamity Jane
 History of French animation

References

External links 

 

2020 animated films
French animated feature films
Annecy Cristal for a Feature Film winners
2020s French films
Cultural depictions of Calamity Jane